The men's 110 metres hurdles event at the 1995 Summer Universiade was held on 29–30 August at the Hakatanomori Athletic Stadium in Fukuoka, Japan.

Medalists

Results

Heats
Qualification: First 4 of each heat (Q) and the next 4 fastest qualified for the quarterfinals.

Wind:Heat 1: -0.1 m/s, Heat 2: -0.2 m/s, Heat 3: -2.0 m/s, Heat 4: -1.0 m/s, Heat 5: -2.2 m/s

Quarterfinals
Qualification: First 4 of each heat (Q) and the next 4 fastest (q) qualified for the semifinals.

Wind:Heat 1: -1.3 m/s, Heat 2: -0.6 m/s, Heat 3: -1.1 m/s

Semifinals
Qualification: First 4 of each semifinal qualified directly (Q) for the final.

Wind:Heat 1: -0.1 m/s, Heat 2: +0.4 m/s

Final
Wind: +0.4 m/s

References

Athletics at the 1995 Summer Universiade
1995